Gaspar Noé (born 27 December 1963) is an Argentine filmmaker based in Paris, France. He is the son of Argentine painter, writer, and intellectual Luis Felipe Noé.

In the early 1990s, Noé along with his wife Lucile Hadžihalilović were the co-founders of a production company Les Cinémas de la Zone. He has directed seven feature films: I Stand Alone (1998), Irréversible (2002), Enter the Void (2009), Love (2015), Climax (2018), Lux Æterna (2019), and Vortex (2021).

Early life

Noé was born in Buenos Aires, Argentina. His father Luis Felipe Noé is of Spanish, Italian, and French-Basque descent while his mother, Nora Murphy is of Irish and Spanish descent.  He has a sister named Paula. He lived in New York City for one year as a child, and his family emigrated to France in 1976 to escape the political situation in Argentina at the time. Noé graduated from Louis Lumière College in France in 1982.

Artistry
His work has been strongly associated with a collection of films often described as new extreme films.  Highlighting their challenging sexual and violent bodily imagery, Tim Palmer has described them as part of a cinéma du corps (cinema of the body), and a cinema of 'brutal intimacy' because of its attenuated use of narrative, generally assaulting and often illegible cinematography, confrontational subject material, a treatment of sexual behavior as violent rather than mutually intimate, and a pervasive sense of social nihilism or despair.

Noé often directly addresses the audience in confrontational ways, most notably in I Stand Alone, when an intertitle warns the audience that they have 30 seconds to leave the cinema before the final violent climax. In a different way, this can be seen in Irreversible, in which the 10-minute long single-take rape sequence has frequently been read as an assault on viewers, as well as a depiction of an assault on the female character.

Collaboration 
Gaspar Noé and Lucile Hadžihalilović have repeatedly collaborated with each other on film projects. Noé operated the camera and was the cinematographer for two short films directed by Hadžihalilović: La Bouche de Jean-Pierre (1996) and Good Boys Use Condoms (1998). Similarly, Hadžihalilović produced and edited Carne (1991), edited Seul contre tous (1998) and was credited as a writer on Enter the Void (2009). The creative collaboration is made clear in the comparable stylistic choices across these early films, most clearly the credit sequences and the marketing designs.

Three of his films feature the character of a nameless butcher played by Philippe Nahon: Carne, I Stand Alone and, in a cameo, Irréversible.

The music for two of his films, Irréversible and Climax, were composed by Thomas Bangalter.

In collaboration with Saint Laurent, he directed films Lux Æterna and Saint Laurent - Summer of ‘21.

Influences
Noé stated in the September 2012 edition of Sight & Sound magazine that seeing 2001: A Space Odyssey at the age of seven changed his life, without which experience he would never have become a director. A poster for the film features notably in a scene towards the end of Irreversible. 

Noé also cites the 1983 Austrian serial killer film, Angst, by Gerald Kargl, as a major influence.

Personal life
He is married to filmmaker Lucile Hadžihalilović. Although he resides and works in France, he does not possess French citizenship.

Noé suffered a near fatal brain hemorrhage in early 2020, which partly inspired the plot of his film Vortex.

Filmography

Feature films

Short films
 Tintarella di luna (1985)
 Pulpe amère (1987)
 Carne (1991)
 Une expérience d'hypnose télévisuelle (1995)
 Sodomites (1998)
 We Fuck Alone (1998) segment of Destricted
 Intoxication  (2002)
 Eva (2005)
 SIDA (2008) segment of 8
 Ritual (2012) segment of 7 Days in Havana
 Shoot (2014) segment of Short Plays
 Saint Laurent - Summer of '21 (2020)

Music videos
Animal Collective - "Applesauce"
Arielle – "Je Suis si Mince"
Bone Fiction – "Insanely Cheerful"
Nick Cave and the Bad Seeds – "We No Who U R"
Placebo – "Protège-Moi"
SebastiAn – "Love in Motion"
Thomas Bangalter – "Outrage" and "Stress" (both from the Irréversible soundtrack)
SebastiAn – "Thirst"

Other production credits

In 2013, Noé shot the cover art for American singer-songwriter Sky Ferreira's debut album Night Time, My Time.

Reception 
Many of Noé's films were polarizing or controversial with viewers due to their inclusion of graphic scenes of violence and sexual violence. I Stand Alone, Irreversible, Enter the Void, We Fuck Alone, and Climax were all considered controversial for their challenging sexual and violent imagery.

Irreversible 
Irreversible was hugely divisive amongst critics with journals such as Sight and Sound (UK) and Positif (France) allowing critics to openly voice their disagreements about the film. It caused substantial outrage in many countries for its central scene of rape, filmed in a single take and lasting nearly ten minutes in total, with some critics comparing it to pornography because of its length and the use of a static camera, as well as considering the film as a whole to be deeply homophobic for its hellish portrayal of a gay S&M club. On the other hand, it was also frequently praised for its brutal portrayal of the horrors of rape, and its implicit challenge to viewers of the scene. Eugenie Brinkema, for instance, describes Irreversible as "ethically, generically, subjectively" disruptive: "the rape [...] is real, it is private, it is contained – it is insufferably present. [...] it interrogates vehicles of receptivity and the power and violence done to bodies by bodies".

Awards

References

Sources 

 Frey, Mattias. (2016). Extreme Cinema: The Transgressive Rhetoric of Today’s Art Film Culture. Rutgers University Press.
 Horeck, Tanya, & Kendall, Tina. (Eds.). (2011). The New Extremism in Cinema: From France to Europe. Edinburgh University Press.
 Palmer, Tim. (2011). Brutal intimacy: Analyzing Contemporary French cinema. Wesleyan University Press.
 Palmer, Tim. (2015). Irreversible. Palgrave Macmillan.
 Russell, Dominique. (Ed.). (2010). Rape in Art Cinema. Continuum.

External links

 
 Le Temps Détruit Tout : Unofficial & International website about Gaspar Noé
 Interview with Gaspar Noé about 'Enter the Void' Part 1 (Spanish)
 Interview with Gaspar Noé about 'Enter the Void' Part 2 (Spanish)
 2014 Bomb Magazine discussion between Matthew Barney & Gaspar Noé 

1963 births
Living people
Argentine atheists
Argentine cinematographers
Argentine emigrants to Italy
Argentine expatriates in France
Argentine expatriates in Italy
Argentine expatriates in Switzerland
Argentine expatriates in the United States
Argentine film directors
Argentine film editors
Argentine film producers
Argentine male writers
Argentine screenwriters
Academic staff of European Graduate School
Male screenwriters
Psychedelic drug advocates
Writers from Buenos Aires
Postmodernist filmmakers